Dobrușa may refer to several places in Romania:

 Dobrușa, a village in Ștefănești Commune, Vâlcea County
 Dobrușa River

and in Moldova:

Dobrușa, a commune in Șoldănești District
 Dobrușa, a village in Negureni Commune, Telenești District

See also 
 Dobre (disambiguation)
 Dobra (disambiguation)
 Dobrin (disambiguation)
 Dobrești (disambiguation)
 Dobrotești (disambiguation)
 Dobrescu (surname)